The McInroy Collection is a collection of meter stamps of Great Britain and the world up to 2003 that forms part of the British Library Philatelic Collections. It was formed by Dr R. McInroy and donated to the Library in 2004. As of March 2007 it comprised 116 boxes of material but with much duplication.

References

British Library Philatelic Collections
Philately of the United Kingdom